Mutafchiyski is a surname. Notable people with the surname include:
Radko Mutafchiyski (born 1989), Bulgarian footballer
Ventsislav Mutafchiyski (born 1964), Bulgarian military doctor